Jerona is a rural town and coastal locality in the Shire of Burdekin, Queensland, Australia.

Geography 
The town of Jerona is on the western side of the estuary of  Barratta Creek on the northern coast of the locality. Most of the locality is within the Bowling Green Bay National Park, except for the town and a small area on the eastern boundary of the locality.

History 
The area was originally a cattle grazing property known as Jerona and Soulbourne holdings held by Lorenzo Fabrellas.

The locality was named on 1 November 1980, presumably after the name of the earlier grazing property.

References 

Towns in Queensland
Shire of Burdekin
Coastline of Queensland
Localities in Queensland